

Hecca (or Heca) was an Anglo-Saxon Bishop of Selsey. According to the Anglo-Saxon Chronicle, Hecca was chaplain to Edward the Confessor and became bishop when Grimketel died in 1047. He was an Englishman, and a royal clerk. He died in 1057.

Notes

Citations

References

External links
 

1057 deaths
Bishops of Selsey
11th-century English Roman Catholic bishops
Year of birth unknown